The Nigerian Civil Aviation Authority (NCAA) is the civil aviation authority of Nigeria. 

 the Director General of NCAA is Captain Muhktar Usman.
The current Director General is Capt. Musa Shuaibu Nuhu.

Offices
Its head office (Corporate Headquarters) is located on the grounds of Nnamdi Azikiwe International Airport in the national capital of Nigeria, Abuja. It has regional offices in the Murtala Muhammed International Airport in Ikeja Lagos State, also acting as the Operational Headquarters of the agency, Port Harcourt International Airport in Port Harcourt, and in Kano.

References

External links

Nigerian Civil Aviation Authority
NCAA Carrier Portal

Government of Nigeria
Nigeria
Civil aviation in Nigeria
Transport organizations based in Nigeria